Inconsequential Tales is a collection of horror stories by Ramsey Campbell, published by Hippocampus Press in 2008. It contains an introduction by the author, "Truth or Consequences"; a theatrical sketch, "A Play for the Jaded" (1994); and the following stories:

"The Childish Fear" (1966)
"The Offering to the Dead" (1995)
"The Reshaping of Rossiter" (1990)
"The Void" (1993)
"The Other House" (1972)
"Broadcast" (1971)
"The Urge" (1993)
"The Sunshine Club" (1983)
"Writer's Curse" (1980)
"Property of the Ring" (2000)
"Night Beat" (1973)
"The Shadows in the Barn" (1975)
"The Precognitive Trip" (2008) (written 1973)
"Murders" (1975)
"Point of View" (2000)
"The Grip of Peace" (1988)
"Only the Wind" (1990)
"Morning Call" (1995)
"Pet" (2008) (written 1974)
"Hain's Island" (2002)
"Bait" (1983)
"Snakes and Ladders" (1982)
"The Burning" (1991)

2008 short story collections
Fantasy short story collections
Horror short story collections